Sinclair Charles Wood OBE (c. 1897 – 26 July 1984), was a British Advertising Director and a Liberal Party politician.

Background
He was educated at Cheltenham Grammar School. He married Betty. In 1944 he was awarded the OBE. In 1945 he was awarded the Legion of Merit by the President of USA.

World War One
He served in the Army from 1914-1919.

Professional career
After starting out as a journalist Wood became a city advertising specialist. He was an authority on market research and the marketing problems of industry. He was Managing Director of the British Export Trade Advertising Corporation. He was Managing Director of Pritchard Wood and Partners.

World War Two
In 1940 Wood joined the Royal Air Force Voluntary Reserve. He was a radar operator on a close-support radar unit and saw service in Africa, Malta, Sicily and Italy. He was appointed Assistant Director of Organisation at the Air Ministry with the rank of acting Wing-Commander.

Political career
He was elected to Wycombe Rural District Council. He was first Treasurer and then Chairman of the Home Counties Liberal Federation. He was a member of the Liberal Party Council and of the party National Executive. He was Chairman of the party publicity committee. He was selected by Reading Liberal Association to be their candidate for the 1945 General Election but he withdrew and did not contest the elections. He was Liberal candidate for the Eton and Slough division of Buckinghamshire at the 1950 General Election. He came third in a four-way contest;

He did not stand for parliament again.

References

1984 deaths
Liberal Party (UK) parliamentary candidates